A statue of Joseph Warren is installed in a lodge adjacent to the Bunker Hill Monument in Charlestown, Boston, in the U.S. state of Massachusetts.

Description and history
The statue was sculpted by Henry Dexter based on a portrait of Warren by John Singleton Copley. It was commissioned during the 1850s, unveiled and dedicated on June 17, 1857, and originally housed in a temporary structure. A permanent granite lodge to house the sculpture was built by the Monument Association at the start of the 20th century.

References

1857 establishments in Massachusetts
1857 sculptures
Charlestown, Boston
Monuments and memorials in Boston
Outdoor sculptures in Boston
Sculptures of men in Massachusetts
Statues in Boston